Aubrey Joseph Bourgeois (December 7, 1907 – December 4, 2011) was a rear admiral in the United States Navy Supply Corps. He graduated from the United States Naval Academy in 1930.

References

United States Navy rear admirals
American centenarians
Men centenarians
1907 births
2011 deaths
United States Naval Academy alumni
People from St. James Parish, Louisiana